Felix Kurt Jähn (born 28 August 1994), known professionally as Felix Jaehn, is a German DJ and music producer specializing in tropical house. He achieved international success with his remix of Omi's song "Cheerleader", which topped the charts in multiple countries and reached number-one on the Billboard Hot 100 in 2015.

Early life 
Jaehn was born in Hamburg and raised in Schönberg, near Wismar in Mecklenburg-Vorpommern, Germany. He took violin lessons at age of 5 and began his DJ career at 16. Jaehn lived in London for a year, where he attended Point Blank Music College at the age of 17. Afterwards he briefly studied Business Administration at Humboldt-University in Berlin.

Career

2013–present 
He began his career in the early 2010s. In August 2013, he released his debut single "Sommer am Meer". In November 2014, he released the single "Shine". In March 2015, he released the single "Dance with Me". In April 2015, he released a remix of Rufus and Chaka Khan classic "Ain't Nobody" retitled "Ain't Nobody (Loves Me Better)" featuring the vocals of Jasmine Thompson (based on an earlier charting version of the song by Thompson). The remix was an international pan-European hit topping the German Singles Chart. He is now signed to Universal Music. In July 2015, he released the single "Eagle Eyes". In 2017, he collaborated with Mike Williams for the single "Feel Good", released through Spinnin' Records.

He is arguably best known for remixing Jamaican singer Omi's song "Cheerleader". The single was an international hit, topping the charts in Australia, Germany, Austria, Belgium (Flanders and Wallonia), Canada, Mexico, Denmark, France, Ireland, the Netherlands, Slovakia, Sweden, Switzerland, the United Kingdom, and the United States. It was also known as a popular wedding dance song in the United States.

In 2018, NOTD and Jaehn released the single "So Close", with a music video that starred Sports Illustrated Swimsuit cover girl Camille Kostek. In February of the same year, he released his debut studio album, I. The album features guest vocals by Marc E. Bassy, Gucci Mane, Jasmine Thompson, Polina, Alma, and Herbert Grönemeyer.

Eff 
In 2015, Jaehn launched Eff, a music duo project made up of German singer Mark Forster (real name Mark Cwiertnia, born 11 January 1984) as vocalist and Jaehn as DJ and producer. The two met in an event in Vienna in 2015. Eff is a reference to Felix and Forster. Their first and only single as Eff was "Stimme" that has topped the German Singles Chart for three consecutive weeks, also charting in Austria and Switzerland.

Personal life 
Jaehn came out as bisexual in an interview for Die Zeit in February 2018, stating "sometimes I was more interested in girls, sometimes more interested in boys." In February 2021, Jaehn confirmed in an interview with radio station Energy that he has been in a relationship with a man since summer 2020 and that the two met via Tinder.

Discography 

 I (2018)
 Breathe (2021)

References

External links 

 

German DJs
1994 births
Musicians from Hamburg
Living people
Tropical house musicians
Humboldt University of Berlin alumni
Bisexual men
Bisexual musicians
German LGBT musicians
LGBT DJs
German LGBT artists
Electronic dance music DJs
Remixers